Jean-Guy Allard (1948 – August 16, 2016) was a Canadian journalist, who worked as an editor and reporter for Le Journal de Montréal and Le Journal de Québec from 1971 to 2000. He retired to Cuba, and later wrote for Granma. He wrote several books, including one on Robert Ménard and Reporters without Borders, and one on Luis Posada Carriles.

Books
 (with Marie-Dominique Bertuccioli), Le dossier Robert Ménard: pourquoi Reporters sans frontières (RSF) s'acharne sur Cuba, Montreal/Paris: Lanctôt éditeur, 2004
 La filière terroriste du FBI, Timéli (Ginebra), 2005
 Posada Carriles, cuarenta años de terror, Editora Politica (La Habana), 2006
 Washington - Miami: la conexión terrorista del FBI, Editora Politica (La Habana), 2008
 (with Eva Golinger), La Agresión Permanente: USAID, NED y CIA, Caracas: Ministerio del Poder Poder Popular para la Comunicación y la Información, 2009 (Review in Spanish)

References

1948 births
2016 deaths
Canadian male journalists
Canadian male non-fiction writers
Journalists from Quebec
People from Shawinigan
Writers from Quebec
Canadian expatriates in Cuba